Hartwig von Ludwiger (29 June 1895 – 3 or 5 May 1947) was a German general in the Wehrmacht of Nazi Germany during World War II. Ludwiger was responsible for numerous atrocities committed throughout the Balkans. After the war, he was charged with war crimes in Yugoslavia, convicted, and executed.

World War I and interwar period
Hartwig von Ludwiger was born in Beuthen, Silesia, in 1895. He had two brothers, both of whom were killed during World War II. Ludwiger was called to the Prussian Army on 17 (or 19) August 1914, shortly after the outbreak of World War I, as an officer candidate. He fought in World War I with the 11th Grenadier Regiment, after being commissioned a Leutnant on 30 July 1915. Ludwiger served in various platoons and companies as commander and participated in several well-known battles of the Great War in the Western Front – the battle of Champagne, the battle of Arras, the battle of Somme, the battle of Flandres and the battle of Maas – earning the Iron Cross 1st Class for his bravery. He was also wounded in action several times and was awarded the Wound Badge in Silver. 

After the capitulation of the German Empire in 1918, he was retained in the Reichswehr. During the early 1920s, he took part in the suppression of the Silesian Uprisings. He was promoted to Oberleutnant in July 1925 and Hauptmann in 1930. He served in various infantry regiments, and as part of the military mobilization following Adolf Hitler's rise to power, he was named commander of the 3rd Battalion of the 28th Infantry Regiment in 1936, with the rank of Major.

World War II

France and Soviet Union
On 1 March 1940, Ludwiger was appointed commander of the 83rd Infantry Regiment of the 28th Infantry Division, with which he took part in the Invasion of France. Following Operation Barbarossa, he was awarded the Knight's Cross of the Iron Cross on 15 July 1941, and was promoted to Oberst on 1 September 1941. Due to the heavy casualties his regiment (and the division as a whole) suffered while fighting in the Battle of Moscow, the 28th Infantry Division was moved to occupied France to refit as a Jäger division on 1 December. The 28th Jäger Division was sent back to the front in southern Ukraine, where it participated in the Battle of the Kerch Peninsula in the Crimea and in the Strait of Kerch.  During his award ceremony, he met his future superior, Hubert Lanz, and his future subordinate Harald von Hirschfeld.

Yugoslavia
Ludwiger was posted as commander of the 704th Infantry Division in Yugoslavia on 20 February 1943. The division was later (1 April 1943) renamed to 104th Jäger Division and Ludwiger assumed his post on 3 March 1943, while within the next month, he was promoted to Generalmajor.

Ludwiger was quite active in the anti-Partisan operations. In particular, he was placed in command of a unit consisting mainly of the 724th Jäger Regiment and a Bulgarian regiment, designated Kampfgruppe von Ludwiger (Battle Group von Ludwiger). Aided by the Italian Taurinense Division, Kampfgruppe Ludwiger was tasked with the obliteration of armed guerrillas in the area of Montenegro, mainly Chetniks and Tito's communist partisans. This campaign was launched on 20 May under the codename Fall Schwarz (Case Black). But, as partisans deliberately avoided open battles with the well-equipped German forces (at least in Ludwiger's sector), the overall action of the Kampfgruppe returned rather poor results. Subsequently, the unit was dissolved on 9 June and Ludwiger with his staff returned to Požarevac.

Of course, Ludwiger didn't quit his activities concerning the suppression of partisans. But with chances of extermination of the partisan forces themselves being slim, in the meanwhile Ludwiger launched a terror campaign against the civilian population. Specifically, he implemented the typical 50:1 reprisals ratio, which ordered the execution of 50 civilian hostages for every German killed by partisan activity. As a result, in two months' time, from 1 April to 1 June, Ludwiger's superior, supreme commander of Military District Serbia, General Paul Bader, was virtually flooded with Ludwiger's requests for reprisals, but he nevertheless authorized them. In total, 500 civilians were killed in reprisals for the murder of 8 German soldiers and 2 Serbian mayors from partisans, while numerous villages were looted and torched.

Greece

Upon completion of Operation Black, 104th Jäger Division was ordered to move to Western Greece. While on march to Agrinio, on 10 July, the 2nd Company of the division's Pioneer Battalion was ambushed near the Trichonida Lake by Greek guerrillas, who were reported to be dressed like British soldiers. Two officers and 16 soldiers were killed, while another 20 were wounded and several vehicles were destroyed. The next day, an officer was killed from a hand grenade tossed on his vehicle. Ludwiger, installing his headquarters in Agrinio, applied to carry out his usual reprisal tactics against civilians, but this time his request was rejected from the staff of Army Group "E", as the Germans initially tried to maintain good relations with the Greek population. Despite this, German forces razed a village near Nafpaktos and executed 12 "suspicious gangsters".

After the Allied invasion of Sicily, Italian forces signed an armistice with the Allied troops. The Germans were prepared for this possibility and launched Operation Achse to forcibly disarm Italian troops in southern France and the Balkans. The 1st Company of the 724th Battalion of Ludwiger's division was ordered to disarm the Italian garrison in Kefalonia along with the 1st Mountain Division, something that resulted in one of the largest executions of POWs to be committed during World War II: the massacre of the Acqui Division in September 1943.

Ludwiger was promoted to Generalleutnant on 1 January 1944. As of by August 1944, Ludwiger's forces continued the reprisals against the Greek population, now aided by SS divisions. Ludwiger wrote in his report that 

Ludwiger and the surviving elements of his division, which had suffered heavy casualties in the Balkans, were captured towards the end of the war. His successor in command of 104th Jäger Division, Generalleutnant Friedrich Stephan was captured as well and was shot in Ljubljana along with three other generals without trial from Yugoslav partisans in early June.

Trial and conviction
After being held in a POW camp, Ludwiger was put on trial before a Yugoslavian court-martial in Belgrade (during the 6th Process of the Yugoslav war crimes trials of German officials) between 27 March and 4 April 1947, along with several German officers, such as Generalmajor  and SS-Brigadeführer und Generalmajor der Waffen-SS Karl von Oberkamp, all of whom received the death penalty. Ludwiger was specifically indicted for [...] Harassment, torture and murder of POWs and prisoners of the People's Liberation Army, for torching, looting, kidnapping of non-combatants to concentration camps and violent crimes against women and children.
Found guilty of the charges, he was sentenced to death on 1 April 1947. He was executed in a prison at Belgrade; The exact date varies according to the source - possibly on 3 or 5 May, and less plausibly on 25 April.

Awards

 Knight's Cross of the Iron Cross
 Knight's Cross of the Iron Cross on 15 July 1941 as Oberstleutnant and commander of Infanterie-Regiment 83
 163rd Oak Leaves on 23 December 1942 as Oberst and commander of Jäger-Regiment 83

Notes

References

Sources

 
 
 Fellgiebel, Walther-Peer. "Elite of the Third Reich:The Recipients of the Knight's Cross of the Iron Cross 1939-1945: A Reference", Helion and Company Limited 2003
 
 
 
 

1895 births
1947 deaths
German mass murderers
People from Bytom
People from the Province of Silesia
Lieutenant generals of the German Army (Wehrmacht)
Recipients of the Knight's Cross of the Iron Cross with Oak Leaves
Executed military leaders
German people convicted of war crimes
German occupation of Greece during World War II
Nazis executed by Yugoslavia by hanging
Prussian Army personnel
Executed people from Silesian Voivodeship
Recipients of the clasp to the Iron Cross, 1st class
Executed mass murderers